The New Mexico Territory provided the following units for the Union army during the American Civil War. Not yet a state of the Union, it did not have a required quota of soldiers to raise. However, 6,561 men volunteered their services.  They were primarily raised for defenses within the territory.

Infantry
5 regiments were provided for three year terms, while one regiment and 11 companies were raised for three-months service.
1st Regiment New Mexico Volunteer Militia Infantry (November, 1861 - February, 1862)
1st Regiment New Mexico Volunteer Infantry (July, 1861 - May, 1862)
1st New Mexico Volunteer Infantry, Reorganized  (October 1, 1863 - November 7, 1866)
2nd Regiment New Mexico Volunteer Infantry (July, 1861 - May, 1862)
3rd Regiment New Mexico Volunteer Infantry (mounted)  (August, 1861 - May, 1862)
4th Regiment New Mexico Volunteer Infantry (September, 1861 - May, 1862)
5th Regiment New Mexico Volunteer Infantry (November, 1861 - May, 1862)
Independent Companies, New Mexico Volunteer Militia Infantry

Cavalry
Initially 5 three-month companies were raised.  
Independent Companies, New Mexico Volunteer Cavalry

Subsequently one three-year regiment was raised, and then one 6-month regiment.
1st Regiment New Mexico Volunteer Cavalry (org from 1st, 2nd, 4th and 5th Reg'ts of New Mexico Vol. Inf., May, 1862 - September 30, 1866)
1st Battalion New Mexico Cavalry and Infantry (org from 1st Reg't Cav August 31, 1866 - November 23, 1867)

Notes

References
 Dyer, Frederick H. (1959). A Compendium of the War of the Rebellion. New York and London. Thomas Yoseloff, Publisher. .
 Frederick H. Dyer, A Compendium of the War of the Rebellion, The Dyer Publishing Company, Des Moines, Iowa, 1908; (Part 3) Regimental Histories, New Mexico Volunteers, pp.1366-1367
 Phisterer, Frederick. (1883). Statistical Record of the Armies of the United States. New York: C. Scribner's Sons. p. 343.
 The Civil War Archive

See also
Lists of American Civil War Regiments by State
New Mexico in the American Civil War

New Mexico
 
Civil War